Shohreh is a Persian feminine given name meaning "famous".

Notable people
Shohreh Aghdashloo (born 1952), Iranian-American actress
Shohreh Bayat (born 1987), Iranian chess referee
Shohreh Solati (born 1957), Iranian singer

Notes

Persian feminine given names